The 1946–47 season was the 40th year of football played by Dundee United, and covers the period from 1 July 1946 to 30 June 1947. United finished in tenth place in the Second Division.

Match results
Dundee United played a total of 39 competitive matches during the 1946–47 season.

Legend

All results are written with Dundee United's score first.
Own goals in italics

Division B

Scottish Cup

League Cup

Supplementary Cup

See also
 1946–47 in Scottish football

References

Dundee United F.C. seasons
Dundee United